Roble may refer to:

 Roble Hall, residence hall at Stanford University
 Jawahir Roble, Somali-born British football referee
 Roble Afdeb, a famous Somali legendary poet and warrior.

Plants
Roble is a Spanish common name for oaks. Species known as roble in English include:
Quercus lobata, tree native to California
Lophozonia obliqua, tree native to South America and cultivated in the British Isles